Korth is a German language surname. It stems from a reduced form of the male given name Konrad – and may refer to:
Fred Korth (1909–1998), 56th U.S. Secretary of the Navy 
Heimo Korth (1950s), American outdoorsman
Kathleen Korth (1952), American film editor
Penne Percy Korth (1942), American diplomat

References 

German-language surnames
Surnames from given names